Widhwidh, also known as Widh Widh, is a town located in the Buuhoodle district of Togdheer, Somaliland.

Overview

The district was part of the 2010 Ayn clashes on 19 July 2010. 

The town is inhabited by the Barkad sub-clan of the Farah Garad branch of the Dhulbahante clan. On October 10, clan chiefs, intellectuals and the diaspora community from the Barkad sub-clan held a meeting in the Widh Widh District and voiced support for the  Khatumo II Conference to be held in the Taleex District.

History
In 1921, Widhwidh was one of many foreign cities. 

In May 2010, fighting broke out between the Darod-dominated armed group HBM-SSC and the Somaliland forces. On June 13, Somaliland's Foreign Minister described HBM-SSC as a "terrorist group" and said it was responsible for the violence in Buuhoodle and Widhwidh. On June 26, fighting broke out between Somaliland forces and anti-Somaliland forces in Kalabaydh and Widhwidh. Another battle took place in Widhwidh in July. Residents were evacuated to neighboring towns. In August, the elders of Togdheer and Buuhoodle jointly proposed a settlement. However, Somaliland government rejected the proposal, saying that it respects the will of the council of elders, but that the strategy of the Somaliland forces is a full-time matter for the Somaliland government.

In 2011 HBM-SSC collapsed due to internal divisions. Nevertheless, the anti-Somaliland forces of the Dhulbahante clan did not disappear, and in 2012 a new organization called Khatumo State.

In 2011 a peace conference was held in the town between the local community and the Somaliland government.

In February 2014, Ethiopian forces and Somaliland government arrested Al-Shabaab officials near Widhwidh. The Somaliland government had agreed in a pact to the capture of criminals by Ethiopia in areas under its own control.

In July 2015, Somaliland forces, which had been in retreat for some time now, drove out Khatumo State forces stationed in Widhwidh.

In April 2016, the Somaliland forces sent 25 new military vehicles to Widhwidh to counter Khatumo State forces.

In July 2016, Widhwidh elders demanded the withdrawal of Somaliland troops on the occasion of the funeral of recently deceased Swedish Chief Garaad Abshir Saalax in Widhwidh, as the funeral could also attract anti-Somalilanders. In the same month, a meeting was held to determine Garaad Abshir Saalax's successor.

Since the end of 2016, the idea of merging Khatumo State into Somaliland took shape; in February 2017, the Khatumo State installed a well in Widhwidh, using funds from Somaliland's telecommunications company Telesom.

In September 2019, a mother and child care hospital was established in Widhwidh district, funded by the overseas Diaspora.

In January 2020, a mysterious epidemic killed 12 children in the Widhwidh district. After investigating the cause, the Somaliland Ministry of Health announced that this was a simultaneous outbreak of three diseases: pneumonia, fever, and diarrhea, and that the problem had been resolved.

In June-July 2020, a clash between the Hayaag (of the Dhulbahante) in Buuhoodle and the Reer Hagar (of the Dhulbahante) in WidhWidh.

In August 2020, envoys from the clans living in Buuhoodle and Ceegaag visited the Widhwidh district and held a meeting to end the war between the two clans.

In October 2020, road construction began connecting Tuulo Smakaab, Widhwidh and Goonle was started. Tuulo Smakaab is located in the middle of the main road that passes through the center of Somaliland and the Sool region, and when completed, this road will provide convenient transportation from the center of Somaliland to the district of Buuhoodle.

In June 2021, a mayoral election for Buhoodle District in Somaliland was held in Widhwidh, and Khadiija Ahmed Yusuf of the Kulmiye Party as mayor and Mustafe Cabdi Ayaanle of the Waddani Party as deputy mayor was elected. But Buuhoodle city did not participate in this election. Khadija Ahmed Yusuf is the first woman elected mayor in the history of Somaliland.

On July 22, 2021, Garaad Maxamed Garaad Abshir Saalax, he is a son of Garaad Abshir Saalax, who died in 2016, was officially recognized as the successor Garaad (clan chief). The inauguration ceremony brought together elders, politicians, and ordinary citizens living in Puntland, Somaliland, Ethiopia, and other countries.

See also
Administrative divisions of Somaliland
Regions of Somaliland
Districts of Somaliland
Somalia–Somaliland border

Notes

References
Widhwidh, Somalia

External links
Maplandia World Gazetteer

Populated places in Togdheer